Philip Holland may refer to:
 Philip Holland (politician)
 Philip Holland (minister)